Withrow High School (originally East Side High School) is a public high school located on the east side of Cincinnati, Ohio.  It is part of the Cincinnati Public Schools.

History
The school opened in 1919 and was listed on the National Register of Historic Places in 1983. Frederick W. Garber's firm was involved in the school's design, known for its arching entry bridge,  clock tower, plantings and trees,  campus, and large sports complex.

Academics
Withrow High School students have received national recognition for their academic achievements. While Withrow has received the highest rating ("Excellent") on the Ohio standardized tests three times since 2004, their current rating, is "Effective". Additionally, the school graduated 100% of its seniors and nearly all of them received college scholarships in 2006.

Withrow currently operates two academic programs: Withrow International High School and Withrow University High School. The Withrow University program opened to high school freshmen in the Fall of 2002. This class became Withrow University's first graduating class on May 19, 2006. The International Program dates back to the 1980s.

Modernization

Starting in 2000, Withrow went through a modernization period.

The remodelling included the classrooms, media center and cafeteria; the gymnasium and football complex have been improved due to gifts provided by alumni and the NFL team, the Cincinnati Bengals.

School traditions
Withrow has maintained many traditions over the years. The Withrow Band has been recognized nationally many times and was chosen to march in the Independence Day Parade in Washington, D.C. in 2008. Withrow students and teachers put on two variety shows for many years: The Withrow Minstrels and the Sounds of Withrow. Artifacts from Withrow's 100-year history are maintained in The Withrow Museum. Graduates have placed hundreds of testimonials on engraved bricks all around the entrance to the school.

Ohio High School Athletic Association state championships

 Baseball - 1950
 Girls Track and Field - 2015, 2016

Notable alumni
 Curtis Anderson, former NFL and USFL player.
 Ethan Allen, former MLB player.
 Teddy Bailey, former NFL player.
 Carole Black, former President and CEO of Lifetime Entertainment Services.
 Tyrone Brown, former NFL player.
 Rosemary Clooney, former actress and singer.
 Jimmie Dodd, former Disney Mousketeer and musician.
Yancy Gates (born 1989), basketball player for Ironi Nahariya of the Israeli Premier League
 Joey Jackson, former NFL player.
 Al Lakeman, former MLB player.
 Ruth Lyons pioneer radio and television broadcaster 
 Neil McElroy, former United States Secretary of Defense.
 Ron Oester, former MLB player.
 Louis Orr, former NBA player.
 John Ruthven, wildlife artist.
 Tony Scott, former MLB player.
 Robert Surtees, cinematographer.
 LaSalle Thompson, former NBA player.
 Perry Williams, former NFL player.

References

Further reading

 The East Side High School; Cincinnati Ohio, Garber & Woodward Architects,  Architectural record, Volume 51 By American Institute of Architects pages 329-337

Cincinnati Public Schools
High schools in Hamilton County, Ohio
Frederick W. Garber buildings
Public high schools in Ohio